Planet Y2K is the debut studio album by American recording artist Liz, released on November 15, 2019 through Moving Castle. Following a public falling out with former record label Mad Decent in 2016, Liz released a one-track experimental pop mixtape called Cross Your Heart. This experience fueled Liz's creative pursuits in creating her debut album, calling it "a culmination of a lot of work I did independently" As the title implies, Planet Y2K features "sonic flavors reminiscent of late '90s / early '00s Europop scene and features influences frovarious artists of that time period including Britney Spears, Kylie Minogue, DJ BoBo, DJ Sammy, Spice Girls, Mandy Moore, Dream, Savage Garden, and Ace of Base

Music
The album opens with a trance-pop and techno cover of Kate Bush's 1985 hit "Cloudbusting". "Self-love anthem" "Diamond in the Dark" features vocals from American pop artist Slayyyter and production from Dylan Brady of 100 Gecs. "Lottery" features American drag artist and rapper Aja and has been described as "sound[ing] like Britney Spears gone full hedonist". "Intuition" was described by the singer as "so bubblegum it's punk". The track was originally written by Jimmy Harry for Kylie Minogue in 1993, but went unreleased until Harry brought the demo to Liz. It features "moody synths, '90s beats, and heart-on-your-sleeve lyrics". "Lost U 2 The Boys" is a song about a date gone wrong, inspired by the "island groove" of Ace of Base. The post-modern "Bubblegum" features "hyperspeed, chipmunk-sounding vocal effects, and rubbery production to back the campy, over-the-top lyrics".

Track listing

References

2019 debut albums
Liz (musician) albums
Albums produced by Dylan Brady
Albums produced by Jimmy Harry